Lavern Ahlstrom is a retired provincial level politician and former leader of the Alberta Social Credit Party.

Political career
Ahlstrom first became involved with Social Credit in the 1970s. He has been a perennial candidate for the party with some moderately successful showings during his career. Ahlstrom first ran for office in electoral district of Rocky Mountain House in the 1979 Alberta general election finishing second to Progressive Conservative Jack Campbell.

He ran for a second time in the 1986 Alberta general election, this time for the Representative Party of Alberta finishing third. In that election he was once again defeated by Campbell. He would run again in the  1993 Alberta general election once again for Social Credit finishing a strong second to Progressive Conservative Ty Lund.

In the 1997 Alberta general election he would go against Lund for a second time coming up with his best electoral result ever, finishing a close second again. He would attempt another run against Lund in the 2001 Alberta general election this time being defeated finishing second in a landslide. He would run for the last time in the 2004 Alberta general election this time as party leader finishing in a second place tie.

Leader of Social Credit
Ahlstrom was elected leader of Social Credit after James Alberts departed in 2001 after a poor showing in the 2001 Alberta general election. Ahlstrom's leadership of the Alberta Social Credit Party has been notable for the party re-embracing elements of Social Credit economic and monetary theory. Electoral wise he led the party to a better showing running 43 candidates in the 2004 Alberta general election earning 1.2% of the popular vote. The last election contested under his leadership was the Drumheller-Stettler by election held in June 2007. Social Credit finished a very strong third vastly improving their showing in the district over 2004.

He resigned as leader and was replaced by Len Skowronski in November 2007.

References

External links

Canadian people of Swedish descent
Alberta Social Credit Party leaders
Alberta Social Credit Party candidates in Alberta provincial elections
Year of birth missing (living people)
Living people
Place of birth missing (living people)